Ephippiocarpa is a genus of flowering plants belonging to the family Apocynaceae.

Its native range is Southern Somalia to Southern Africa.

Species:

Ephippiocarpa humilis 
Ephippiocarpa orientalis

References

Apocynaceae
Apocynaceae genera